The Ducasse d'Ath is a traditional parade held to mark the victory of David over Goliath that takes place in the town of Ath in Belgium.

The parade is held on the fourth Sunday of August every year and is characterised by the presence of processional giants depicting many characters from local history. From 2008 to 2022, it was recognised as a Masterpiece of the Oral and Intangible Heritage of Humanity by UNESCO.

History

The city of Ath was founded in 1140 by Baldwin IV, Count of Hainaut, by buying territory from his liegeman, Gilles de Trazegnies. The city experienced considerable expansion in the 14th century, with a church dedicated to Saint Julian of Brioude coming up outside the enclosure of the walled city. The procession used to begin at the church and proceed to the new town. The fourth Sunday of August was chosen as it fell near the feast day of Saint Julien, which is on 28 August. The large biblical figures in the procession also served the purpose of catechising a largely illiterate population.

In 2008, the Ducasse d'Ath was recognised as a Masterpiece of the Oral and Intangible Heritage of Humanity by UNESCO, as part of the bi-national inscription "Processional giants and dragons in Belgium and France". It was delisted in December 2022 following complaints about one of the characters that appears in the procession: a 'savage', depicted by a white person in blackface, wearing a nose ring and chains.

References

Notes

Masterpieces of the Oral and Intangible Heritage of Humanity
Belgian folklore
Festivals in Belgium
Belgian culture
Belgian legends
Medieval legends
Summer events in Belgium
Parades in Belgium